The Harem Tour is a limited edition album consisting of b-sides, demos, and other rarities by classical crossover soprano Sarah Brightman. It was released in CD format only and sold at Brightman's "The Harem World Tour" events and, after the tour concluded, from her web site. No label company, catalog number or copyright warning is mentioned on the CD packaging.

Track listing

Tracks 2, 4, and 9 have been released previously on Gregorian Masters of Chant albums. 
Track 6 and 12 were released on Schiller's album in 2003. 
Track 8 was released on the brown Question of Honour single in 1995. 
Track 11 was released on Sash! "S4" in 2002

Track Information
Kama Sutra: originally slated for the opening song of the Harem album
Join Me: cover of song originally performed by the band HIM, previously released on Gregorian's 3rd album
My Imagination: recorded during the time between La Luna and Harem
Don't Give Up: Sarah's first collaboration with Gregorian, originally performed by Peter Gabriel and Kate Bush
Forbidden Colours: unfinished song recorded during the La Luna sessions. It has since been released on Sarah's 2008 album, Symphony, as a bonus track.
The Smile: recorded with Schiller
Pay No Mind: originally meant for inclusion on Eden
A Question of Honour: extended version from the first single release
Voyage Voyage: yet another collaboration with Gregorian, originally performed by Desireless
Colours of the Rainbow: recorded during the Harem sessions
The Secret Still Remains: guest vocalist on song by the group Sash!
I've Seen It All: recorded with the group Schiller
Watermark: vocalise version of the Enya track originally slated for release on Timeless. Enya's label threatened to put an injunction on the album if this track was included, so it was left off.

References

Sarah Brightman albums
Albums produced by Frank Peterson
2003 compilation albums